Obrazhiivka (Obrazhiyevka) is a village in Shostka Raion, Sumy Oblast, Ukraine.

Notable residents 
 Ivan Kozhedub, Hero of the Soviet Union
 Pyotr Bochek, Hero of the Soviet Union

References 

Villages in Shostka Raion